Sergei Viktorovich Kozko (born 12 April 1975) is a Russian football coach and a former player who is currently a goalkeeping coach with FC Rubin Kazan.

Career statistics

External links
  Player page on the official FC Rubin Kazan website
 

1975 births
Living people
Russian footballers
FC Dynamo Stavropol players
FC Moscow players
FC Rubin Kazan players
Russian Premier League players
Association football goalkeepers
FC Khimki players